Presidential elections were held in Northern Cyprus on 18 April 2010. The result was a victory for Derviş Eroğlu of the National Unity Party, who received 50.38% of the vote in the first round. If no candidate had crossed the 50% threshold, a run-off would have been held on 25 April.

Background
The International Crisis Group stated in an article titled Cyprus: Reunification or Partition?, published on 30 September 2009, that the upcoming elections in April 2010, were of critical importance to the then-ongoing negotiations between Talat and Demetris Christofias to find a solution for the Cyprus dispute. It was stated that the election results could have a defining impact on the future of the island and whether it would be reunited or divided.

Candidates 
The two main candidates were the current President Mehmet Ali Talat from the Republican Turkish Party and the incumbent Prime Minister Derviş Eroğlu from the National Unity Party (Ulusal Birlik Partisi, UBP). In the parliamentary election the previous year, the UBP had narrowly obtained enough seats to form a single-party government.

Talat supported the negotiations for a new plan to reunify the island (and had also been in favour of the Annan Plan for Cyprus) whereas his opponent supports a "two-state solution".

The other five candidates (all of them independent) were:
 Mustafa Kemal Tümkan
 Arif Salih Kırdağ
 Zeki Beşiktepeli
 Ayhan Kaymak
 Tahsin Ertuğruloğlu

Results
Turnout was 70%. The count on election night proceeded as follows:
 20% of the vote counted: Eroğlu at 48.9%, Talat at 43.7%
 32% of the vote counted: Eroğlu at 48.9%, Talat at 43.3%
 40% of the vote counted: Eroğlu at 49.2%, Talat at 43.3%
 48% of the vote counted: Eroğlu at 49.6%, Talat at 43.1%
 60% of the vote counted: Eroğlu at 49.7%, Talat at 43.0%
 96% of the vote counted: Eroğlu at 50.3%, Talat at 42.8%

According to final results, Derviş Eroğlu got over 50% of the votes in the first round, meaning a runoff was not necessary.

Aftermath
Derviş Eroğlu of the right-wing National Unity Party (UBP) said that he wanted to continue negotiation on the reunification of Cyprus: "My dream for a solution to the Cyprus problem continues. We will be at the negotiating table for an agreement that will continue the existence of our people in this land with honour."

References

Northern Cyprus
Presidential elections in Northern Cyprus
2010 in Northern Cyprus
2010s in Cypriot politics
April 2010 events in Europe